Hu Heping (born 24 October 1962) is a Chinese politician and the current Communist Party Secretary of Ministry of Culture and Tourism. Previously, he served as the governor and party chief of Shaanxi province, Communist Party Secretary of Tsinghua University.

Biography
Hu was born in 1962 in Linyi, Shandong province. He graduated with a hydraulic engineering degree from Tsinghua University. He joined the Communist Party while studying at Tsinghua, in June 1982. In 1990 he received a master's of engineering degree. He also worked as an instructor and teaching assistant while becoming involved with the grassroots party organization at the university. In 1992, he entered University of Tokyo to study engineering, by 1995 he had earned his doctorate and then joined the Japanese architecture firm INA.

Hu returned to China in December 1996 and became vice dean of the Department of Hydraulic Engineering at Tsinghua University and the head of the Institute of Water Resources. In 2000, he began overseeing party personnel and human resources at Tsinghua. In 2006, he became executive deputy secretary and vice president of Tsinghua. In December 2008 he was elevated to party chief, the highest position at the university (equivalent in rank to a vice minister of state).

In December 2013, Hu replaced Cai Qi as Organization Department chief of the Zhejiang provincial party committee, making his first foray into regional politics; Hu also earned a Shengwei Changwei seat. In April 2015 he was made deputy party chief of Shaanxi. On 1 April 2016, Hu was promoted to Acting Governor of Shaanxi, succeeding Lou Qinjian. At the time of his appointment as governor, he had just over two years of experience in regional politics. He was confirmed as Governor on 27 April. Analysts suggested the Hu's promotion took the "fast lane." On 29 October 2017, he was elevated to Communist Party Chief of Shaanxi, again succeeding Lou. In July 2020, he was appointed party secretary of the Ministry of Culture and Tourism.

Hu is a full member of the 19th Central Committee of the Chinese Communist Party. Previously, he was an alternate member of the 18th Central Committee.

References

1962 births
Living people
People's Republic of China politicians from Shandong
Chinese Communist Party politicians from Shandong
Political office-holders in Zhejiang
Political office-holders in Shaanxi
Tsinghua University alumni
University of Tokyo alumni
Alternate members of the 18th Central Committee of the Chinese Communist Party
Members of the 19th Central Committee of the Chinese Communist Party
Members of the 20th Central Committee of the Chinese Communist Party
Delegates to the 12th National People's Congress
Deputy Communist Party secretaries of Shaanxi